Ronald Borchers (born 10 August 1957) is a German football coach and former footballer.

Club career 
Between 1975 and 1987, he played for Eintracht Frankfurt, Arminia Bielefeld and Waldhof Mannheim in the Bundesliga. However, he celebrated the majority of his success with Eintracht, winning the UEFA Cup in 1980 and the DFB Cup in 1981.

International career 
Between 1978 and 1981, he played six times for West Germany.

Coaching career 
Following his playing career, he became a coach for lower-league German teams. Since September 2010, he is managing Wormatia Worms. He was the manager of FC 07 Bensheim between 2014 and 2017.

Honours
 UEFA Cup: 1979–80
 DFB-Pokal: 1980–81

References

External links
 
 
 

1957 births
Living people
Footballers from Frankfurt
German footballers
Germany international footballers
Bundesliga players
Eintracht Frankfurt players
Arminia Bielefeld players
FSV Frankfurt players
SV Waldhof Mannheim players
Kickers Offenbach players
Grasshopper Club Zürich players
Viktoria Aschaffenburg managers
Wormatia Worms managers
UEFA Cup winning players
Association football midfielders
German football managers
West German footballers